Exitos is the fourth studio album by the electronic band Electric Company. It was released in 2000 on Tigerbeat6.

Track listing

Personnel 
Brad Laner – instruments, production

References 

2000 albums
Electric Company (band) albums
Tigerbeat6 albums